Al-Dosari is an Arabic surname. It may refer to:
Falah Abdullah Al-Dosari Qatari 
Abdullah Al-Dosari (born 1969), Saudi Arabian footballer
Abdullah Jumaan Al-Dosari (born 1977), Saudi Arabian footballer
Ghanem al-Dosari (born 1980), London-based Saudi human rights activist
Hamad Mubarak Al-Dosari (born 1977), Qatari hurdler
Khamis Al-Dosari (1973–2020), Saudi Arabian footballer
Medhadi Al-Dosari (born 1976), Saudi Arabian former cyclist
Mohamed Jaman Al-Dosari (born 1946), Saudi Arabian sprinter
Mohammed al-Dosari (born 1961), Saudi Arabian runner 
Nassar Al-Dosari (born 1965), Saudi Arabian fencer
Obeid Al-Dosari (born 1975), Saudi Arabian footballer
Rashid Al-Dosari (born 1980), Bahraini footballer
Rashid Shafi Al-Dosari (born 1981), Qatari track and field athlete
Saad Al-Dosari (1977–2004), Saudi Arabian footballer 
Said Khalil Al-Dosari (born 1948), Saudi Arabian sprinter
Saleh Al-Dosari (born 1987), Saudi Arabian footballer
Saud al-Dosari (1971–2015), Saudi television presenter
Youssef Al-Dosari (born 1962), Saudi Arabian hurdler

See also
Dawasir, an Arabian bedouin tribal confederation originating from central Arabia